Jamayne Taunoa-Brown (born 17 November 1996) is an Australian professional rugby league footballer who plays as a  for the North Queensland Cowboys in the National Rugby League (NRL).

He previously played for the New Zealand Warriors, and spent time on loan from the Warriors at the St. George Illawarra Dragons in the NRL.

Early life
Taunoa-Brown was born in Melbourne, Australia, and is of  Indigenous Australian (Kaurna and Narungga) descent through his mother Jaimie, and Māori (Ngāti Kahungunu) descent through his father Brandy. He played his junior rugby league for the Altona Roosters where he then went onto play junior representative rugby league for both the Melbourne Storm and Newcastle Knights.

Playing career
Taunoa-Brown represented the Indigenous All Stars in the 2020 All Stars match.

Taunoa-Brown made his NRL debut in round 1 of the 2020 NRL season for the New Zealand Warriors against Newcastle Knights
starting from the bench, in the 20–0 loss. He scored his first try in the Warriors' 18–0 win over the St. George Illawarra Dragons in round 3 of the same season.
Taunoa-Brown joined the St. George Illawarra Dragons in July 2021 on a short-term loan deal.
On 21 October 2021, he was granted a release by the Warriors from the final year of his contract and signed with the North Queensland Cowboys until the end of the 2023 season.
Taunoa-Brown represented the Indigenous All Stars again in the 2022 All Stars match. He played 16 matches for North Queensland in the 2022 NRL season as the club finished third on the table and qualified for the finals.  Taunoa-Brown did not feature for North Queensland in their finals campaign which ended at the preliminary final stage against Parramatta.

Music career
Taunoa-Brown is also a rapper and hip hop producer, going under the pseudonym "Yung Maynie".

References

External links
New Zealand Warriors profile

1996 births
Living people
Australian people of Māori descent
Australian rugby league players
Indigenous All Stars players
Indigenous Australian rugby league players
New Zealand Warriors players
Ngāti Kahungunu people
St. George Illawarra Dragons players
Rugby league players from Melbourne
Rugby league props
North Queensland Cowboys players